Astathes leonensis is a species of beetle in the family Cerambycidae. It was described by Breuning in 1956. It is known from Sierra Leone.

References

L
Beetles described in 1956
Beetles of Africa